Porky Run is a  long 1st order tributary to Caldwell Creek in Crawford County, Pennsylvania.

Course
Porky Run rises about 1.5 miles east of Shelmandine Springs, Pennsylvania and then flows southeast to join Caldwell Creek about 1.5 miles northeast of East Titusville, Pennsylvania.

Watershed
Porky Run drains  of area, receives about 45.1 in/year of precipitation, has a wetness index of 429.93, and is about 70% forested.

See also
 List of rivers of Pennsylvania

References

Rivers of Pennsylvania
Rivers of Crawford County, Pennsylvania